Marplesia is a genus of South Pacific sheetweb spiders first described by Pekka T. Lehtinen in 1967.  it contains only two species, both found in New Zealand.

References

Araneomorphae genera
Spiders of New Zealand
Stiphidiidae
Taxa named by Pekka T. Lehtinen